Xu Huihui (born February 9, 1986) is an actress and former competitive wushu taolu athlete who lives in the United States. She is a three-time world champion and is one of the most renowned athletes to represent a European country at the World Wushu Championships. In her acting career, she is best known for portraying Helen Takahama / Widow in the Marvel Cinematic Universe films Black Widow and Shang-Chi and the Legend of the Ten Rings (both 2021).

Early life 
On February 9, 1986, Xu was born in Shanghai, China. Xu's mother was Xu Guan Guan who also served as her coach. Xu moved with her family to Italy at the age of nine.

Career

Competitive Wushu 
At the age of six, Xu started practicing wushu. Competing for Italy, Xu's international debut was at the 2003 World Wushu Championships in Macau, where she won a silver medal in daoshu. Two years later, she was a triple medalist in the 2005 World Wushu Championships in Hanoi, Vietnam, becoming the world champion in daoshu. She was the world champion in the same event two years later at the 2007 World Wushu Championships in Beijing, China. This qualified her for the women's daoshu and gunshu combined event in the 2008 Beijing Wushu Tournament where she won the silver medal. Her last major international competition was at the 2009 World Wushu Championships in Toronto, Canada, where she was the world champion in gunshu and also won a silver medal in daoshu.

Acting 
After retiring from competitive wushu, Xu transitioned to acting. She first starred as Sister Mahjong in Tai Chi 0 and Tai Chi Hero, and in the title role in the Chinese TV series The Legend of Wing Chun. In 2012, Xu was recruited to perform in Cirque du Soleil's Michael Jackson: One show, in which she plays one of the four central characters. In 2021, she played a Black Widow named Helen in Marvel Studios' Black Widow and reprised her role in Shang-Chi and the Legend of the Ten Rings, credited simply as "Widow".

Personal life 
Xu is married to David Torok, a fellow wushu competitor. They both reside in the United States.

References

External links

Jade Xu on YouTube
Jade Xu's Official Website

1986 births
Chinese wushu practitioners
Sportspeople from Shanghai
Chinese expatriates in Italy
Cirque du Soleil performers
Living people
21st-century Chinese actresses
Actresses from Shanghai
Competitors at the 2008 Beijing Wushu Tournament
Italian wushu practitioners
Chinese expatriates in the United States